Schönenberg may refer to:

People
 Schönenberg (surname)

Places
 Schönenberg, Baden-Württemberg, Germany
 Schönenberg, Zürich, Switzerland

See also
 Schönenberger (disambiguation)
 Schöneberg (disambiguation)